White Marsh Town Center a  planned community of residential, office, industrial, and retail properties developed by Nottingham Properties, now owned by Corporate Office Properties Trust.  It is located in White Marsh, northeast Baltimore County, Maryland.

History
Plans for White Marsh Town Center were proposed in 1965. Construction of the adjacent Interstate 95 in 1969 justified the proposal and plans for rezoning. The first project, White Marsh Mall, developed by the Rouse Company, opened in 1981.

Shopping Areas

The Avenue at White Marsh
The Avenue at White Marsh is a 300,000 square foot lifestyle center located in White Marsh, Maryland south of White Marsh Mall.

The Avenue was developed as a town-center in a suburb without a center. Its design is drastically different from previous suburban malls and part of a wave of similar destination retail sites across the country. Construction on the Avenue started in 1996 and was completed in 1998 with stores opening to the public as they were ready. Federal Realty Investment Trust purchased The Avenue in early 2007.

The concept for the Avenue at White Marsh was modeled in part after the Reston Town Center, which also blends office, residential, entertainment and retail components. The Avenue stores are situated on both sides, at the beginning, and at the end of a quarter-mile main street. The layout was planned to feel old-fashioned from the stone plaza to the architecture.  The Avenue was criticized early on as a "street without a town."

In 2016, the Avenue at White Marsh was renovated to include a plaza, as well as additional retail space.

A plaza is located at the center of the main street where regular entertainment can take place. Each year in November The Avenue at White Marsh hosts a community Tree Lighting Celebration and in December hosts the White Marsh Holiday Parade. The plaza hosts an ice skating rink during the winter season. During the summer months, the plaza hosts local bands and other entertainment.

In 2018, a longtime tenant, Don Pablo's Mexican Restaurant, closed its restaurant at the Avenue in White Marsh, and was replaced by independently-owned Wayward Smokehouse and The Curious Oyster in 2019. In 2019, another longtime tenant and arts and crafts retailer AC Moore closed their store at the Avenue at White Marsh due to the Company's bankruptcy.

The Avenue supplements White Marsh Mall with retail, food, and service options. More information can be found at www.theavenueatwhitemarsh.com.

The Avenue implemented a youth escort policy in February, 2019.

Nottingham Square
Nottingham Square is a collection of large retail stores and restaurant franchises.  This property is located on Campbell Boulevard between Interstate 95 and Maryland Route 7. Patrons can access to Nottingham Square from two signalized intersections and two unsignalized intersections from Campbell Boulevard.

Retail stores are located in front of a large parking area with perimeter access roads. Behind the parking lots are several restaurants and other services.

Some of the businesses include Best Buy, Bed Bath & Beyond, Party City, Dick's Sporting Goods, Target, Value City, Lowe's, Panera Bread, Chick-fil-A, and McDonald's.

Other Properties
Franklin Ridge
Corporate Place
White Marsh Business Center
White Marsh Hi-Tech Center
Tyler Ridge
McLean Ridge
Nottingham Ridge
Campbell Corporate Center I
White Marsh Professional Center
White Marsh Health Center
Byron Station
White Marsh Plaza
CastleCreek
Eaton Square
Devonshire at White Marsh
Cambridge Court
Maple Ridge
Silver Lake
White Marsh Commerce Center

See also
White Marsh Mall

References

External links

 The Avenue at White Marsh

Shopping malls in Maryland
Baltimore County, Maryland landmarks
Tourist attractions in Baltimore County, Maryland
White Marsh, Maryland